Lake Vidraru is an artificial lake in Romania. It was created in 1965 by the construction of the Vidraru Dam on the Argeș River.

It lies in the shadow of the Făgăraș Mountains. .

Vidraru Lake is a reservoir lake created in 1965 on the Arges River for Hydroelectricity production.

Its annual energy production  in an average hydrological year.

On the right bank, on Plesa mount, one can find the statue 'Energia', representing Prometheus with lightnings in his hand, symbolising electricity. 

 

The construction of the Vidraru dam took five and a half years starting in 1960. For this achievement, it took 42 km of tunnel excavation through 1.768 million m3 of rock, of which about 1 million underground bands have 930,000 m3 of concrete of which 400,000 m3 underground and also were installed 6300 tonnes of electromechanical equipment.

On Lake Vidraru, people can practice the extreme sport of bungee jumping. Only a few hundred metres of the dam tourists can go to the House Argeseana “and the pier where the practice of leisure boat racing.

The only road to access the lake Vidraru is the spectacular Transfagarasan (DN7C), running from Curtea de Arges to Cartisoara, and passing in front of the hydro power plant, on the Vidraru dam, and around Vidraru Lake.

See also
 Lakes of Romania

References

Geography of Argeș County
Lakes of Romania
Reservoirs in Romania
RVidraru